Kampong Chhnang (meaning 'Port of Pottery') is one of the central provinces (khaet) of Cambodia. Neighboring provinces are (from north clockwise) Kampong Thom, Kampong Cham, Kandal, Kampong Speu and Pursat. The provincial capital is the city of Kampong Chhnang.

Etymology

Kampong Chhnang consists of two Khmer words, kampong means "port" or "harbor" and chhnang means "pottery". Both words combine together meaning "Port of Pottery" or "Pottery Harbor".

Geography

Kampong Chhnang is a small province  from Phnom Penh. It is in the alluvial plain of central Cambodia and is drained by the Tonle Sap, a tributary of the Mekong river. The capital city of Phnom Penh has grown until it actually encompasses the provincial border of Kampong Chhnang.

History
The name translates from Khmer literally to Port of Pottery. Archaeological remains from the area have revealed among many other findings artifacts from Dvaravati, a former kingdom in present-day Thailand, dating to the 6th through 11th centuries.

Kampong Chhnang province centuries ago was a coastal city on the route between China and India; due to sedimentation from the Mekong river, the coast line moved much farther to sea. When the Tonle Sap river changed its course, the city lost its main water source and thus was deserted, the population moving to a city called Kampong Tralach. A city gradually formed around it, bring new life to Kampong Chhnang. A museum presents the archaeological record of the city's history.

Symbols
The provincial tree is Diospyros decandra. The provincial slogan is sweet pomelos, delicious rice, beautiful young ladies.

Administrative divisions
The province is subdivided into 7 districts and 1 municipality. The districts are further subdivided into 65 communes (khum) and 478 villages (phum). There is one city and 14 townships. There are also 102 khum administrative organizations (KAO).

References

External links
 Survey of Rice Cropping Systems in Kampong Chhnang Province, Cambodia

 
Provinces of Cambodia